Jéanpaul Ferro (born January 26, 1967, in Providence, Rhode Island) is an American writer of poetry, novels, and short stories, whose works incorporate philosophical, social-political, and topical conventions.  An 8-time Pushcart Prize nominee, his published works include: All The Good Promises (Plowman Press, 1994), Becoming X (BlazeVOX Books, 2008), You Know Too Much About Flying Saucers (Thumbscrew Press, 2009), Essendo Morti – Being Dead (Goldfish Press, 2009), and Hemispheres (Maverick Duck Press, 2009).

Ferro's work has been published and translated in Japan, China, India, Italy, and Serbia.  His work has been featured on National Public Radio [1], Columbia Review, Emerson Review, Connecticut Review, Contemporary American Voices, The Providence Journal, Hawaii Review, and hundreds of other publications. He has also been featured in The Plaza's masterpiece series, Votobia's anthology of American writers, and on WBAR's radio poetry series in NYC.   He is also a 3-time storySouth Million Writers Award  nominee and a 2-time Best of the Net  nominee.  He currently resides in Providence, Rhode Island.

Published works

Short fiction

 All the Good Promises, Plowman Press, 1994,

Poetry

 Becoming X, BlazeVox Books, 2008
 You Know Too Much About Flying Saucers, Thumbscrews Press, 2009
 Essendo Morti - Being Dead, Goldfish Press, 2009, 
 Hemispheres, Maverick Duck Press, 2009
 Jazz, Honest Publishing, 2011,

References
Jéanpaul Ferro.  Goodreads.
All the Good Promises.  Amazon.com.
Essendo Morti - Being Dead.  Goldfish Press.
Essendo Morti - Being Dead Gently Read Literature.
Essendo Morti - Being Dead Pedestal Magazine.
Songs of Distant Earth.  Gold Wake Press.
Becoming X.  BlazeVox Books.
Mohegan Bluffs The Providence Journal, January 27, 2008.
Gun, With Occasional Music Providence Journal, October 26, 2008.
Jazz Jazz, April, 2011
This I Believe - Jeanpaul Ferro National Public Radio
Short story: The Dead River (Blue Lake Review, March, 2011)

External links
Official website of Jéanpaul Ferro

1967 births
Living people
American male poets
American male novelists
American male short story writers
American short story writers
21st-century American poets
21st-century American male writers